Lord Est is a Finnish dancehall reggae duo from Tampere made up of Tuomo Hiironmäki on vocals and his brother Uncle Tan on keyboards. In general, Tuomo writes the lyrics and Uncle Tan (earlier known as D Mon) composes the music. Lord Est has released 5 albums and many singles. They are also known for their cooperation with other artists and musical projects.

Tuomo Hiironmäki started in the 1990s as a rapper and a part of Finnish hiphop group Ghetto Blasta. His graffiti tag was Est, hence the name. The title Lord was invented by his friend from Ghetto Blasta, Big Jay (nowadays manager of the group). Ghetto Blasta broke up and Lord Est became more interested in new dancehall trend by Radio Mafia's late-night show Roots & Culture, hosted by Tero Kaski. After spending couple years in UK, he came up with the idea of doing dancehall in Finnish.

Debut single "Viskit ja rommit" had some airplay on Radio Mafia and became a minor hit in summer 2001. In the year 2002 Lord Est released their debut album called Aatelinen. In 2005 Lord Est released Päivät töissä with singles "Hellä ori" and "Heristä nyrkkii". 3rd album Tulin teitä muistuttaan was released in 2008 and was produced by DJ Control of Beats & Styles. It included singles "Sä teet" and "Sun vieres on lämmin". 4th album Se on päätetty was released in 2009 and singles "Nyt saa juhlia taas" and Tänään räjähtää.

Discography

Albums
2002: Aatelinen
2005: Päivät töissä
2008: Tulin teitä muistuttaan
2009: Se on päätetty
2011: Sonmoro senjoro
Collection albums
2009: Trilogy (Collection album)

Singles

Others
2001: "Viskit ja rommit"
2002: "Linko"
2005: "Hellä ori" (feat Mariska)
2008: "Ilman itsekurii"
2008: "Jotkut muijat" (feat Mariska)
2009: "Nyt saa juhlia taas"
2009: "Tänään räjähtää" (feat Åke Blomqvist)
2010: "Keho on mun temppeli"
2011: "Juoksen vapaana kaupunkiin"

Music videos
2002: "Linko"
2008: "Sä teet"
2010: "Keho on mun temppeli"
2010: "Selvä päivä" (Petri Nygård feat Lord Est)
2011: "Reggaerekka" (feat Petri Nygård)
2011: "Juoksen vapaana kaupunkiin"

Guest
2002: Rockin Da North – "Tuu mun uniin" (feat Janina Frostell, Skandaali, YOR123, Ezkimo & Lord Est)
2002: Rockin Da North – "Kingsize" (feat. B.O.W, Lord Est, YOR123 & Ezkimo)
2004: Hanna B – "Perjantai-ilta" (feat. Urbaanilegenda & Lord Est)
2006: Lord Est – "Mies ilman motiivia" (Versio - Suomireggaen juurikattaus -kokoelmalla)
2008: Elastinen, Cheek & Lord Est – "Syvällä pelissä" (from Syvällä Pelissä vol. 1 collection album)
2009: Cheek – "Kaikki hyvin" (feat Lord Est)
2010: Petri Nygård – "Selvä päivä" (feat Lord Est)

References

External links
Official website

Finnish reggae musicians
Finnish hip hop musicians